The discography of Guttermouth consists of nine studio albums, one live album, four EPs, two singles, two video albums, and five music videos.

Studio albums 

2011 guttermouth and the new threat split ep 2011 (3 new song of guttermouth)

Live albums

Extended plays

Singles

Video albums

Music videos

Other appearances 
The following Guttermouth songs were released on compilation albums, soundtracks, tribute albums, and as music downloads. This is not an exhaustive list; songs that were first released on the band's albums and EPs are not included.

References

External links 
Guttermouth's official website
Guttermouth's official facebook

Discography
Discographies of American artists
Pop music discographies
Rock music discographies